Dirk Barsikow (born 1 October 1962) is a German retired football defender and later manager.

References

1962 births
Living people
German footballers
Chemnitzer FC players
DDR-Oberliga players
2. Bundesliga players
Association football defenders
German football managers
Chemnitzer FC managers
FSV Zwickau managers
VfB Fortuna Chemnitz managers
1. FC Neubrandenburg 04 players
People from Friedland, Mecklenburg-Vorpommern
Footballers from Mecklenburg-Western Pomerania